"Believe Me" is a song by American rapper Lil Wayne. It was serviced to urban contemporary radio stations on May 6, 2014, in the United States and was released as a digital download on May 28, 2014. The song features a guest appearance by Canadian rapper Drake. It was released as the intended lead single from Wayne's twelfth studio album, Tha Carter V, however the song was omitted from the tracklist upon the album's delayed release in September 2018.

Background
On April 30, 2014, boxer Floyd Mayweather Jr. posted a 15-second snippet/video of the song on Instagram. The preview shows Lil Wayne and Drake in the studio recording "Believe Me".

Commercial performance 
As of February 27, 2015, the track has sold more than 1,000,000 copies in United States and has been certified Platinum by the RIAA.

Critical reception 
"Believe Me" was featured on XXLs 25 Best Songs of 2014 (So Far). XXL commented on the song: "Carter Season was officially underway when Weezy dropped this gem on us late on a Friday night, and it was worth every second of the wait".

Charts

Year-end charts

Certifications

References

2014 singles
2014 songs
Lil Wayne songs
Drake (musician) songs
Cash Money Records singles
Song recordings produced by Boi-1da
Songs written by Drake (musician)
Songs written by Lil Wayne
Song recordings produced by Vinylz
Songs written by Vinylz
Songs written by Boi-1da